Heteroclinus heptaeolus, or Ogilby's weedfish, is a species of clinid native to the coast of southern Australia where it can be found in habitats with plentiful seaweed growth.  This species can reach a maximum length of  TL.

References

External links
 Photograph

heptaeolus
Taxa named by James Douglas Ogilby
Fish described in 1885